The twenty-sixth season of Saturday Night Live, an American sketch comedy series, originally aired in the United States on NBC between October 7, 2000, and May 19, 2001.

This season featured satire of the 2000 U.S presidential election, including the Republican and Democratic primaries, the campaigns of Vice President Gore, Texas Governor George W. Bush, and Ralph Nader, the Florida election recount, and the Bush v. Gore case that came before the U.S. Supreme Court.

Cast 
Before the start of the season, longtime cast members Tim Meadows, Cheri Oteri, and Colin Quinn all left the show. Meadows had been on the show for 10 seasons since 1990, while Oteri and Quinn had both been on for five seasons since 1995. The show added two new featured players: SNL head writer Tina Fey and Second City comedian Jerry Minor. Fey had been a writer on the show since 1997 and began as the show's head writer in 1999. Rachel Dratch and Maya Rudolph remained featured players. Minor was let go following this season.

This would be Molly Shannon's final season on the show. Leaving mid-season, she surpassed Victoria Jackson as the show's longest-serving female cast member (Amy Poehler would surpass Shannon's record seven years later).

Chris Parnell was fired at the end of this season, but then rehired midway through the next season. Executive producer Lorne Michaels would later admit he made a mistake in firing Parnell.

With Colin Quinn's anchor seat on "Weekend Update" empty, Lorne Michaels decided to go back to the format used in the late 1970s with two anchors. Jimmy Fallon and head writer Tina Fey were picked to anchor the segment together.

This season also marked the first time since Season 14 that John Goodman didn't host at all. He had previously hosted at least one episode per season for a ten year stretch.

Repertory players
Jimmy Fallon
Will Ferrell
Ana Gasteyer
Darrell Hammond
Chris Kattan
Tracy Morgan
Chris Parnell
Horatio Sanz
Molly Shannon (final episode: February 17, 2001)

Featured players
Rachel Dratch
Tina Fey
Jerry Minor
Maya Rudolph

bold denotes "Weekend Update" anchor

Writers

Jim Downey rejoins the writing staff this season. James Anderson, who went on to write on SNL for decades, joins the writing staff as a new writer.

Episodes

Specials

The Ladies Man film

Based on Leon Phelps' popular sketches, The Ladies Man film was released on October 13, 2000. The film's star Tim Meadows left Saturday Night Live at the end of the previous season but returned to promote the film in the first episode of this season. Cast members Will Ferrell and Chris Parnell and former SNL cast member Mark McKinney co-starred in this film. The movie was panned by critics and flopped at the box office.

See also 
History of Saturday Night Live (2000–2005)

References 

26
Saturday Night Live in the 2000s
2000 American television seasons
2001 American television seasons
Television shows directed by Beth McCarthy-Miller